South Korea-based girl group 4Minute have released two studio albums, one compilation album, seven extended plays (EPs), twenty singles and six soundtrack contributions. The group made their debuted with the song "Hot Issue" on June 15, 2009.

Albums

Studio albums

Compilation albums

Extended plays

Singles

Other appearances

Soundtracks

Video albums

DVDs

Videography

As group artist

As sub-unit 2YOON

Notes

References 

4Minute
Discographies of South Korean artists
K-pop music group discographies